Tank Junction railway station is an abandoned railway station located in Tank District, Pakistan.

See also
 List of railway stations in Pakistan
 Pakistan Railways

References

External links

Railway stations in Tank District
Railway stations on Bannu–Tank Branch Line